Centro Escolar University also referred to by its acronym CEU is a private non-sectarian higher education institution in San Miguel Manila, Philippines. It was founded in 1907 by Librada Avelino and Carmen de Luna as the Centro Escolar de Señoritas. CEU has six campuses: the main campus, Mendiola; the Malolos campus; the Las Piñas campus; the Cebu City campus; and the Makati campuses (Gil Puyat and Legaspi Village campuses). More than 50 academic programs are offered.<refname=yahoo/>

CEU is accredited by the Federation of Accrediting Agencies of the Philippines and the Philippine Association of Colleges and Universities' Commission on Accreditation (as a Level IV school), and has full autonomous status from the Commission on Higher Education (CHED). It is certified by the Institute of Corporate Directors, Department of Trade and Industry, SGS S.A., Arthram International Organization for Standardization, and the ASEAN University Network. In 2022, CEU was awarded with the Safety Seal from the Department of the Interior and Local Government, for meeting minimum public health standards following the COVID-19 pandemic shutdowns.

History

CEU was established in 1907
by pedagogists Librada Avelino and Carmen de Luna as the Centro Escolar de Señoritas, based in Parañaque. Its main purpose was to teach "ideal womanhood, intelligent citizenry, and democratic leadership that would instill in [the women] the tenets of science and virtue." It was the first nonsectarian women's school in the Philippines. When it opened, CEU only had one blackboard, some benches, and a few books, and it wasn't until 1921 that CEU established its first program: the College of Pharmacy. It was followed by the Colleges of Liberal Arts, Education, Dentistry, and Optometry. It began operating as a university in 1930 and in 1932 was converted into a corporation for financial reasons. Its name was then changed to Centro Escolar University, which still holds today. In 2009, the School of Law and Jurisprudence was established.

There is also an Integrated School at CEU, which was established upon the university's founding, where students have the opportunity to attend preschool, primary school as well as high school. The Integrated School was removed from the Mendiola campus in the mid-1990s and in Malolos in 2004 after nearly 100 years open. It were revived starting in the 2014-2015 academic year as the Centro Escolar Integrated School (CEIS) and is offered in Manila, Malolos, and Makati.

There have been seven presidents in the history of the university: Librada Avelino (1907-1934); Carmen de Luna (1934-1962); Pilar Hidalgo-Lim (1962-1972); Dionisio Tiongco (1972-1992); Lourdes Talag-Echauz (1992-2002); Rosita L. Navarro (2002-2006); and Cristina Padolina (2006-present).

Campuses
CEU has six campuses: the main campus, Mendiola; the Malolos campus; the Las Piñas campus; the Cebu City campus; and the Makati campuses (Gil Puyat and Legaspi Village). In 2013, CEU expressed interest in expanding to Baguio and Davao City.

 Cebu City - Opened in 2012, the first campus outside of Luzon.
 Las Piñas - Opened in 1975 as Las Piñas College and was acquired by CEU in 2015.
 Makati, Gil Puyat: Opened in 2005. The university is housed within the Philtrust Bank building in Makati's Central Business District.
 Makati, Legazpi Village: Opened in 2007.
 Malolos campus: Opened in 1978. This campus has a teaching hotel called the Ada (after founder Avelino) for the hospitality and tourism program. This campus is also home to the Centrodome, an auditorium that seats 5,000 people.
 Parañaque campus (defunct): The Parañaque campus was phased out in the 1990s.

 Mendiola campus: Mendiola is the university's main campus and is located on Mendiola Street in Manila's University Belt. The university moved here in 1924 from the Sampaloc campus and has a commemorative marker installed by the Philippines Historical Committee in 1952 to memorialize CEU's establishment.
 Sampaloc campus (defunct): When the university started in 1907, it was held in a rented house in the Sampaloc area of Manila. When its student population became too high, it moved to its permanent home in Mendiola.
 San Beda University related School

Schools
The Graduate School was founded in 1926 during Avelino's presidency. CEU is the only school in the Philippines that offers a post-doctoral degree in Total Quality Management in Higher Education.  

 School of Accountancy and Management: Established in 1928 as the College of Commerce. Previous names include the College of Commerce and Business; the College of Commerce and Secretarial Administration; the College of Accountancy, Commerce, and Secretarial Administration; and the School of Accountancy, Business, Secretarial and Public Administration. The business department has honors from CHED for its excellence. The school is based on the Mendiola campus.
 School of Dentistry: Established in 1925. The school is based on the Mendiola campus.
 School of Education, Liberal Arts, Music and Social Work: Established in the late 1990s when four major departments were combined. The school is based on the Mendiola campus.
 School of Law and Jurisprudence: Established in 2009. Faculty have included Supreme Court Associate Justice Jose Midas Marquez, former Chief Presidential Legal Counsel Salvador Panelo, and Chief Justice Alexander Gesmundo. The school is based on the Makati, Gil Puyat campus.
 School of Medical Technology: Established in 1960. The school is based on the Mendiola campus.
 School of Medicine: The school's first graduates finished their degree in 2021 and scored an 80% passing rate. In 2008, CEU established a subsidiary called the Centro Escolar University Hospital, Inc., but no moves have been made to build a teaching hospital. As such, the school works with the Amang Rodriguez Memorial Medical Center. The school is based on the Mendiola campus.

 School of Nursing: Established in 1975. CEU nursing students on the Makati campus earned a 100% passing rate on the licensure exam in 2021. The school is based on the Mendiola campus.
 School of Optometry: Established in 1928. The school has honors from CHED for its excellence; in 2021, CEU optometry students earned the top passing rate of the licensure exam at 93.6%. The school is based on the Mendiola campus.
 School of Pharmacy: Established in 1921, the first higher education program at the university. In 1999, the College of Pharmacy became the School of Pharmacy with the introduction of MS and PhD programs. The BS became available on the Malolos campus in 2001 and the BS and Pharm.D. were available in Makati, Gil Puyat in 2005. It is a founding member of the Philippine Association of the Colleges of Pharmacy and the Asian Association of Schools and Pharmacy. The school is based on the Mendiola campus.
 School of Science and Technology: Established in 1928 as the School of Science. It was the first school in Asia to offer a cosmetic science degree.  The school is based on the Mendiola campus.
 School of Nutrition and Hospitality Management: Established as the College of Foods and Nutrition. Previous names include the College of Nutrition and Home Economics (1967); College of Nutrition, Home Economics and Tourism (1989); and the School of Tourism, Family Economics, and Nutrition (2001) before landing on the School of Nutrition and Hospitality Management in 2007. The school is based on the Mendiola campus.

Sport
CEU offers varsity sports in basketball, volleyball, futsal, cheerleading, badminton, swimming, Taekwondo, and table tennis. Scorpion varsity teams are part of the Women’s National Collegiate Athletic Association, the Men’s National Collegiate Athletic Association, Universities and Colleges Basketball League, and the National Capital Region Athletic Association and have played competitions in the Philippine Basketball Association D-League, Breakdown, the Philippine Chinese Amateur Basketball League, and the Philippine Basketball League. The men's basketball team on the Malolos campus have been part of the Bulacan Collegiate Athletic Association and Private Schools Athletic Association. Recent coaches of men's basketbal include Derrick Pumaren (2018-2019), Jeff Napa (2020), and Chico Manabat (2020-present).

Notable alumni

Entertainment

 Gina Alajar - Tourism and Travel; director and actress 
 Nora Aunor - high school (1970s); actress, singer, and producer
 Gabby Concepcion - Dentistry; actor and singer
 Ney Dimaculangan - Conservatory of Music; musician, formerly of 6cyclemind
 Louie Ignacio - BA Mass Communication; director
 June Macasaet - BS Marketing; model and pageant titleholder
 Buenaventura S. Medina Jr. - PhD South East Asian Studies; author
 C. J. Muere - Dentistry; former actor
 Cherry Pie Picache - Dentistry (did not finish); actress

 Daniel Razon - high school (1983), BA Mass Communication (1987) - journalist, TV and radio host, and minister in the Church of God International
 Ryan Rems - BA Communication Arts; TV personality and comedian
 Willie Revillame - high school, Dentistry (did not finish); TV host, actor, and comedian
 Shermaine Santiago - Broadcasting; actress, TV host, and singer
 Erik Santos - BS Psychology (2010); singer, actor, and TV host
 Amada Santos Ocampo - BA Music; pianist and composer
 Jay Taruc - Mass Communication (Broadcasting) (late 1990s); journalist
 Darryl Yap - Mass Communication (Broadcasting); film director and screenwriter

Politics
 Concepcion A. Aguila - Master of Law (1926), Master of Arts (1937) - lawyer, pedagogist, former Executive Director and Dean at CEU, and former UN regional chairman
 Lani Cayetano - BA Mass Communication (1991); Mayor of Taguig (2010-2019, 2022-present); former Representative of the Legislative district of Pateros-Taguig, House of Representatives (2007–2010)
 Gwendolyn Ecleo - Doctor of Dental Medicine (2001); former mayor of Dinagat Township (2004-2013)
 Minerva G. Laudico - BS Social Work (1930s); first women's sectoral representative in the Philippines' House of Representatives, and former president of the United Nations Association of the Philippines.
 Salvador Laurel - elementary (1993-1935); former Vice President of the Philippines
 Fidel V. Ramos - high school (1930s); Doctor of Laws (Honoris Causa) (1987); former President of the Philippines, 1992–1998.

Religion
 Rolando Tirona - elementary (1952), high school (1958); Archbishop of Caceres

Sports
 Alvin Abundo - Hotel and Restaurant Management; PBA player for NorthPort Batang Pier
 Misagh Bahadoran - Dentistry (2010); footballer with Maharlika Manila F.C., futsal player on the Philippines national team
 Vergel Meneses - Integrated School; mayor of Bulakan (2019-present), retired PBA player
 Janine Pontejos - Business Administration; professional WNBL player, Philippine national team member, current basketball coach of the CEU Lady Scorpions

References

 
Universities and colleges in Manila
Education in San Miguel, Manila
Educational institutions established in 1907
Companies listed on the Philippine Stock Exchange
Business schools in the Philippines
Liberal arts colleges in the Philippines
Dental schools in the Philippines
Nursing schools in the Philippines
Graduate schools in the Philippines
Companies based in Manila
1907 establishments in the Philippines